Paulus IV may refer to:

 Patriarch Paul IV of Constantinople (ruled 780 to 784)
 Pope Paul IV (1476–1559)